Margaret (Meg) Wheatley (born 1944) is an American writer, teacher, speaker, and management consultant who works to create organizations and communities worthy of human habitation.  She draws from many disciplines: organizational behavior, chaos theory, living systems science, ancient spiritual traditions, history, sociology, and anthropology.

Early life and education 
Born in Yonkers, New York, in 1944, to an English father who was a mechanic running a foreign car service and a Jewish-American mother, Wheatley grew up in the New York City area. Her grandmother, Irma Lindheim, was a well-known activist, writer, and fund-raiser for the creation of the state of Israel. Lindheim lived in the kibbutz Mishmar HaEmek, frequently visiting her family in the U.S.A. She was Wheatley’s primary guide and role model.

Wheatley graduated from Lincoln High School (Yonkers, New York), in 1962. She completed her baccalaureate degree in 1966 at the University of Rochester, where she majored in English and history, and spent her junior year abroad at the University College London.

From 1966–1968, Wheatley served in the Peace Corps in Cholla Namdo Province, Korea, teaching high school English. She returned from Korea via the Trans-Siberian Railroad, and recalled she and her travelling companion were assumed to be CIA agents in the Peace Corps, and were called "thugs wearing peace masks."

Advised by Neil Postman, Wheatley received her M.A. in communications and systems thinking from New York University.  She moved to the Boston, Massachusetts area when she was 30 years old to earn her Ed.D. in Administration, Planning, and Social Policy at Harvard Graduate School of Education. Her dissertation was titled Equal Employment Opportunity Awareness Training: the Influence of Theories of Attitude Change and Adult Learning in the Corporate Setting.

In 1977, while completing her doctoral work at Harvard, Wheatley married a widower who had five children aged five to sixteen. They added two more children together for a total of six boys and one girl. They divorced in 1992 and remain a very strong and loving Italian-American family.  As of 2020, there are 23 grandchildren and six great-grandchildren.  Most of the family lives in Utah, where Wheatley has resided since 1989.

Career 
Wheatley's practice as an organizational consultant and researcher began in 1973, working with Rosabeth Moss Kanter in the firm Goodmeasure, Cambridge MA.  Kanter mentored her well and is the reason Wheatley moved so quickly into being both a keynote speaker and author.

Since 1973 Wheatley has worked on every inhabited continent in "virtually every type of organization" and with people in all positions, from government prime ministers to small town religious ministers, from teen-age social entrepreneurs to corporate CEOs, from the head of the U.S. Army to the Dalai Lama.   She has considered herself a global citizen since her youth.

Wheatley has been Associate Professor of Management in two graduate programs: the Marriott School of Management, Brigham Young University, and Cambridge College, Massachusetts.  She served in a formal advisory capacity for leadership programs in England, Croatia, Denmark, Australia, and the United States. Through the Berkana Institute, (a global charitable leadership foundation, founded by Wheatley and friends in 1991) she worked with leadership initiatives in India, Senegal, Zimbabwe, South Africa, Mexico, and Brazil as well as Europe. The Berkana Institute has worked globally (especially in the Global South) with dedicated, creative, spiritually-grounded leaders, all of whom are experimenting with new forms of leading and organizing.  Berkana’s current work is training leaders and activists as Warriors for the Human Spirit.

Wheatley has a strong spiritual practice.  From 2010 to 2018, she did long winter retreats  to Gampo Abbey, a Tibetan Buddhist monastery in Nova Scotia, under the direction of her teacher, Pema Chödrön. She cites Namkhai Norbu who died in 2018 as her Tibetan teacher. She is now a student of the Indian mystic and yogi, Sadhguru.

Awards and tributes 
Wheatley has received multiple awards and honorary doctorates.

In 1992, her first book, Leadership and the New Science, won the award from Industry Week as the best management book, as well as one of CIO Magazine's "Top Ten Business Books of the 1990s," and one of Xerox Corporation's "Top Ten Business Books of all time."

The American Society for Training and Development (ASTD) has named her one of five living legends. In May 2002, ASTD awarded her their highest honor: "Distinguished Contribution to Workplace Learning and Performance," with the following citation:

She was elected to the Leonardo da Vinci Society for the Study of Thinking in 2005.

In 2010, she was appointed to the National Park Service advisory board by the Obama White House and the United States Secretary of the Interior, Ken Salazar. She served until 2018 when the twelve member advisors resigned en masse in protest of the new policies of the government of President Donald Trump. 

She received a Lifetime Achievement Award from the International Leadership Association (ILA) in 2014. An interviewer from ILA said:

The introduction to her interview with staff from the Association for Talent Development notes, "Meg Wheatley writes, teaches, and speaks about radically new practices and ideas for organizing in chaotic times. She works to create organizations of all types where people are known as the blessing, not the problem. Her last book, Turning to One Another: Simple Conversations to Restore Hope to the Future, proposes that real social change comes from the ageless process of people thinking together in conversation."

In 2016, Wheatley was honored with the Clara Snell Woodbury Distinguished Leadership Award, as well as recognition from Leadership California.

Publications 
Her books include:

 1992. Leadership and the New Science: Discovering Order in a Chaotic World (in 3 editions and 20 languages), Berrett-Koehler Publishers; .
 1998. A Simpler Way (with Myron Kellner-Rogers), Berrett-Koehler Publishers; .
 2002. Turning to One Another: Simple Conversations to Restore Hope to the Future, Berrett-Koehler Publishers; .
 2007. Finding Our Way: Leadership for an Uncertain Time, Berrett-Koehler Publishers; . 
 2010. Perseverance (paintings by Asante Salaam), Berrett-Koehler Publishers; .
 2011. Walk Out Walk On: A Learning Journey into Communities Daring to Live the Future Now (with Deborah Frieze), Berrett-Koehler Publishers; .
 2012. So Far From Home: Lost and Found in Our Brave New World, Berrett-Koehler Publishers; .
 2014. How Does Raven Know: Entering Sacred World /A Meditative Memoir,  Berkana Publications;  
 2017. Who Do We Choose to Be?: Facing Reality, Claiming Leadership, Restoring Sanity, Berrett-Koehler Publishers; .
 2020. Warriors for the Human Spirit: A Songline. A Journey Guided By Voice And Sound. An mp3 with accompanying book. (music by Jerry Granelli), Berkana Publications; .

References

External links 
 Margaret J. Wheatley homepage

1944 births
American management consultants
American non-fiction writers
Brigham Young University faculty
Harvard Graduate School of Education alumni
Living people
New York University alumni
Peace Corps volunteers